Dean Lake or Deans Lake may refer to:

Dean Lake (Annapolis), a lake in Nova Scotia
Dean Lake (Colchester), a lake in Nova Scotia
Dean Lake, Ontario
Dean Lake, Minnesota, an unorganized territory
Dean Lake (Crow Wing County, Minnesota), a lake in Minnesota
Dean Lake (Wright County, Minnesota), a lake in Minnesota
Deans Lake (Minnesota), a lake in Scott County
Dean Lake (Montana), a lake in Montana
Dean Lake (Duchesne County, Utah)